The long-tailed duck (Clangula hyemalis), formerly known as oldsquaw, is a medium-sized sea duck that breeds in the tundra and taiga regions of the arctic and winters along the northern coastlines of the Atlantic and Pacific Oceans. It is the only member of the genus Clangula.

Taxonomy
The long-tailed duck was formally described by the Swedish naturalist Carl Linnaeus in 1758 in the tenth edition of his Systema Naturae. He placed it with all the other ducks in the genus Anas and coined the binomial name Anas hyemalis. Linnaeus cited the English naturalist George Edwards's description and illustration of the "Long-tailed duck from Hudson's-Bay" that had been published in 1750 in the third volume of his A Natural History of Uncommon Birds. This duck is now the only species placed in the genus Clangula that was introduced in 1819 to accommodate the long-tailed duck by the English zoologist William Leach in an appendix to John Ross's account of his voyage to look for the Northwest Passage. The genus name Clangula is a diminutive of the Latin clangere meaning "to resound". The specific epithet hyemalis is Latin meaning "of winter". The species is considered to be monotypic: no subspecies are recognised.

In North American English it is sometimes called oldsquaw, though this name has fallen out of favour. Some biologists have also feared that this name would be offensive to some Native American tribes involved in the conservation effort. 
The American Ornithologists' Union stated that "political correctness" was not sufficient to change the name, but "to conform with English usage in other parts of the world", it officially adopted the name "Long-tailed Duck".

An undescribed congener is known from the Middle Miocene Sajóvölgyi Formation (Late Badenian, 13–12 Mya) of Mátraszőlős, Hungary.

Description

Adults have white underparts, though the rest of the plumage goes through a complex moulting process. The male has a long pointed tail ( long) and a dark grey bill crossed by a pink band. In winter, the male has a dark cheek patch on a mainly white head and neck, a dark breast and mostly white body. In summer, the male is dark on the head, neck and back with a white cheek patch. The female has a brown back and a relatively short pointed tail. In winter, the female's head and neck are white with a dark crown. In summer, the head is dark. Juveniles resemble adult females in autumn plumage, though with a lighter, less distinct cheek patch.

The males are vocal and have a musical yodelling call ow, ow, owal-ow.

Behaviour

Breeding
Their breeding habitat is in tundra pools and marshes, but also along sea coasts and in large mountain lakes in the North Atlantic region, Alaska, northern Canada, northern Europe, and Russia. The nest is located on the ground near water; it is built using vegetation and lined with down. They are migratory and winter along the eastern and western coasts of North America, on the Great Lakes, coastal northern Europe and Asia, with stragglers to the Black Sea. The most important wintering area is the Baltic Sea, where a total of about 4.5 million gather. As of 2022 it has also been breeding in parts of Western Europe, such as on the Marker Wadden in The Netherlands.

Food and feeding
The long-tailed duck is gregarious, forming large flocks in winter and during migration. They feed by diving for mollusks, crustaceans and some small fish. According to the Audubon Society Field Guide to North American Birds they can dive to 80 fathoms (146 meters or 480 feet). They are the only ducks that use their wings to dive, which gives them the ability to dive much deeper than other ducks.

Status
The long-tailed duck is still hunted across a large part of its range. There has been a significant decline in the number of birds wintering in the Baltic Sea, partly due to their susceptibility to being trapped in gillnets. For these reasons the International Union for Conservation of Nature (IUCN) has categorised the long-tailed duck as vulnerable. It is one of the species to which the Agreement on the Conservation of African-Eurasian Migratory Waterbirds (AEWA) applies.

References

External links

 
 
 Feathers of Long-tailed Duck (Clangula hyemalis)
 

long-tailed duck
Birds of the Arctic
Holarctic birds
long-tailed duck
long-tailed duck